James Joyce's Women, filmed in 1982 and 1983, is a 1985 released British/Irish period drama film produced by and starring Fionnula Flanagan as writer James Joyce's wife Nora and some of the real women in Joyce's life and fictional women from the writer's novels. The film is based on Fionnula Flanagan's 1977 play James Joyce's Women.

Flanagan had a role in the 1967 film Ulysses.

Cast
 Fionnula Flanagan – Nora, Harriet Shaw Weaver, others
 Chris O'Neill – James Joyce
 James E. O'Grady – The Interviewer
 Tony Lyons – Leopold Bloom
 Paddy Dawson – Stannie Joyce
  Martin Dempsey – Joyce's Father
 Gerald Fitzmahony – The Dublin Gossips
 Joseph Taylor – Dubliner
 Rebecca Wilkinson – One of Two Washerwomen
 Gladys Sheehan – One of Two Washerwomen
 Gabrielle Keenan – Cissy Caffrey
 Michelle O'Connor – Edy Boardman
 Zoe Blackmore
 Terry Flanagan
 Brian Dunne

See also
 Ulysses (1967 film)

References

External links

trailer to the film

1985 films
Universal Pictures films
1985 drama films
British drama films
1980s English-language films
1980s British films